Hemantharaathri is a 1978 Indian Malayalam film, directed by P.Balthasar and Produced by P. Balthasar.The film stars Jayan, Jayabharathi, Vincent and Adoor Bhasi  in the lead roles. The film has musical score by A. T. Ummer.

Cast
Jayan as Vinodh
Kamal Hassan as Dr. Ravi 
Jayabharathi as Radha and Usha (Double Role)
Vincent as Ramesh
Adoor Bhasi as Shankaran Pilla Radhas Father
Bahadoor as Appu
Prema as Kunjamma
Unnimary as Jaanu

Soundtrack
The music was composed by A. T. Ummer and the lyrics were written by Bichu Thirumala.

References

External links
 

1978 films
1970s Malayalam-language films
Films directed by I. V. Sasi